Parrot Cay is an island in the Turks and Caicos Islands. Parrot Cay became a private island resort in 1998.

History
Parrot Cay was originally created by a Kuwaiti family in 1988, who built the large structure that now functions as the resort's main building. The Gulf War affected the finances of this family, and it remained empty until it was bought over and remade into a resort in 1998 by Singaporean hotelier Christina Ong for her COMO Hotels and Resorts group. It is said that her daughter Melissa Ong discovered the island during a diving trip.

The island was originally named Pirate Cay because of a local legend that famous female pirate Anne Bonny camped here in the 1720s. It was renamed Parrot Cay as to not frighten visitors.

Resort
Parrot Cay's main resort contains 61 rooms, including beach houses and villas. Two restaurants are located on the island: the south-east Asian inspired Lotus and the Italian-Mediterranean Terrace.

Activities include diving, snorkeling, and wellness programs like yoga and Pilates at the COMO Shambhala retreat.

Private homes
In addition to the resort's rooms, there is a collection of private villas and beach houses located a short distance from the resort in a location called Rocky Point. The villas can be purchased from a starting price of US$10 million, while the beach houses start from US$5 million. Owners of private homes in Parrot Cay include Keith Richards, Donna Karan, and Bruce Willis. Bruce Willis sold his home in 2019.
Keith Richards has been quoted as saying he'd relocate his family to his Parrot Cay retreat if he knew his death was coming, and just "hang out".

Popularity
Because of its secluded location and the privacy it provides, Parrot Cay has become very popular with many celebrities. Guests have included Paul McCartney, Justin Timberlake, Barbra Streisand, Penélope Cruz, Julia Roberts and Phil Collins, and it has also hosted the weddings of Ben Affleck and Jennifer Garner in 2005.

Celebrity death hoaxes
Parrot Cay is frequently featured as the location of an ongoing celebrity death hoax on fake news site Global Associated News. The fake news report would claim that a celebrity had died after sustaining injuries in a jet-ski accident in Parrot Cay, even though there are no jet-skis in Parrot Cay. Celebrities that have supposedly died in Parrot Cay according to this hoax include Ted Nugent, Ja Rule, Chad Kroeger and Vince Vaughn.

References

External links 
 Official site
 Forbes article about Parrot Cay

Caicos Islands
Populated places in the Turks and Caicos Islands
Private islands of the Caribbean